Remetea Mare (or Großremete) is a commune in Timiș County, Romania. It is composed of two villages, Ianova and Remetea Mare (commune seat).

Geography 
Remetea Mare is located in the center of Timiș County, 12 km east of Timișoara. It is crossed by DN6 (E70) and the Bega Canal. It borders Pișchia to the northeast, Recaș to the east, Bucovăț to the south and Giarmata to the west. The commune covers an area of 58.15 ha.

History

Remetea Mare 

Remetea Mare was first mentioned in 1333 as Remete, but most likely the village is much older. The area has been inhabited since the first Iron Age (Hallstatt culture, c. 1200–300 BC), as evidenced by recent archaeological discoveries. The village was called Remetea Timișană, an alternative name used until now. In the Middle Ages, there would have been a town (market) called Sasvár, mentioned in the papal tithe records from 1332–1337. Sasvár was allegedly guarded by a fortress with a watchtower that aimed to protect the Timișoara Fortress from external attacks. The Sasvár Fortress, meaning "Fortress of the Eagles", was demolished immediately after the occupation of Banat by the Ottomans. Other details about this settlement are not known, but in popular parlance the name of a place known as Șușioara has been preserved.

During the Turkish occupation of Banat, no information is known about the settlement. The modern history of the locality is linked to the name of this family. Initially they sold the estate to other owners, but then they recovered it, and in 1720 Baron László Ambrózy built a mansion which is still preserved today. In 1848 this mansion served as a field hospital.

Although located in the immediate vicinity of Timișoara, on the road that connected the capital of Banat with Lugoj, Remetea Mare was inhabited mainly by Romanians, although there were also inhabitants of other nationalities, especially Germans and Hungarians. In 1911, the Romanians built their new Orthodox church.

In the interwar period it was rounded to Plasa Chișoda, Timiș-Torontal County, it had a national house, a choir, a cultural society and the St. George Society.

Ianova 
Ianova is about as old as Remetea Mare. The first recorded mention of Ianova dates from 1333 (Jenev). The presence of Serbs was noticed very early here, probably in the 11th century. During the Middle Ages it was inhabited and ruled by various local noblemen, as evidenced by the numerous feudal documents of change of ownership. In Ianova are the ruins of a medieval fortification dating from the 14th–16th centuries and is located in the south of the village, in the place called "Turkish fortress".

It was inhabited during the Ottoman occupation, as in 1690 it is mentioned as Jenovo. On Count Mercy's map from 1723–1725 it is mentioned as Janova, being inhabited by Romanians. Later it was also called Temesjenő.

In 1968 it was incorporated in the commune of Remetea Mare, together with Bucovăț and Bazoșu Nou.

Demographics 

Remetea Mare had a population of 2,302 inhabitants at the 2011 census, up 9% from the 2002 census. Most inhabitants are Romanians (92.18%), with a minority of Hungarians (1.39%). For 5.73% of the population, ethnicity is unknown. By religion, most inhabitants are Orthodox (86.4%), but there are also minorities of Roman Catholics (3.34%) and Pentecostals (2.65%). For 5.73% of the population, religious affiliation is unknown.

Notable people 
 Mihai Șora (b. 1916), philosopher and essayist

References 

Communes in Timiș County
Localities in Romanian Banat